Pulveroboletus is a genus of fungi in the family Boletaceae. The genus has a cosmopolitan distribution and contains 41 species.

Taxonomy
The genus was first described by American mycologist William Alphonso Murrill in 1909. He defined species in the genus as having a cap and stem "clothed with a conspicuous sulphur-yellow, powdery tomentum, which may be the remains of a universal veil: context white, fleshy; tubes adnate, yellowish, covered with a large veil: spores oblong-ellipsoid, ochraceous-brown: stipe solid, annulate, not reticulate." Murrill set Pulveroboletus ravenelii as the type species.

Species
The genus consists of the following species:

Former speciesPulveroboletus acaulis, moved to Buchwaldoboletus acaulisPulveroboletus flaviporus, moved to Aureoboletus flaviporusPulveroboletus parvulus, moved to Buchwaldoboletus parvulusPulveroboletus phaeocephalus, moved to Xerocomus phaeocephalusPulveroboletus viridis, moved to Boletus viridisPulveroboletus xylophilus, moved to Buchwaldoboletus xylophilus''

References

External links

 
Boletaceae
Boletales genera
Taxa named by William Alphonso Murrill